Echimyinae is a subfamily of rodents belonging to the spiny rats family Echimyidae. It contains 14 arboreal genera—all the members of the tribe Echimyini, plus Callistomys—a few terrestrial genera (Thrichomys, Hoplomys, and Proechimys), and a subaquatic genus (Myocastor).

Systematics
The taxonomic content of Echimyinae has been reshaped over time, because of two realizations. The first is a better understanding of the evolution of morphological characters, leading to the recognition that key character states long used to group genera into higher units were demonstrably homoplastic. The second came from the a phylogenetic analysis of molecular sequence data.

Phylogeny
The subfamily Echimyinae groups most of the spiny rat family's generic diversity into two tribes: Echimyini and Myocastorini.

References

Echimyidae
Mammal subfamilies